The history of the Railways on the West Coast of Tasmania has fascinated enthusiasts from around the world, because of the combination of the harsh terrain in which the railways were created, and the unique nature of most of the lines.

Points of note include the Mount Lyell rack railway which has an Abt rack system, the presence of the world's first Garratt locomotive and a Hagans articulated locomotive on the North East Dundas Tramway, and the collection of narrow-gauge lines as the only links to the outside world for a number of the communities for over fifty years.

The haulage railways at Mount Read, and the various ones in the area of the Mount Lyell mining lease, were also significant in their use in moving both people and metal ore. Also aerial ropeways were operating in the region well into the late twentieth century.

A number of railway lines were proposed in the late nineteenth century, and early twentieth century – but they never appeared – not all proposed lines are listed here.

The main mining towns during their boom times were connected with the outside world by railway as the main form of transport into their communities and also out to the outside world.

Railways, tramways and haulages 

Most lines were    track gauges.
See also Zeehan for tramways that centred on that location
The following list is of most of the significant named lines but it is not a complete list. There have also been haulage lines, and other tramlines within small areas that existed in mining leases and forest areas.

 Comstock Tramway, Zeehan 
 Zeehan to Comstock – 
 Comstock Tramway, Mount Lyell
 Queenstown to Comstock Mine – 
 Emu Bay Railway
 Burnie to Zeehan – 
 Lake Margaret Tram
 Howards Plains to Lake Margaret power station and community – 
 Macquarie Heads breakwater railway
 The main access between Cape Sorell lighthouse and the local jetty and wharf
 Magnet Tramway
 Magnet Junction to Magnet Mine – 
 Mount Dundas – Zeehan Railway
 Zeehan to Maestris 
 Mount Lyell Aerial Trams
  Four aerial systems are shown on Mt Lyell Mining Field Map (1900–1901) in editions of The Peaks of Lyell 
  Lyell-Tharsis Aerial Tram – Lyell Tharsis Mine (just south of the North Lyell Mine) to Mt Lyell Aerial Tram 
  Mount Lyell Aerial Tram – from Mount Lyell Mine on Philosophers Ridge to Queenstown Smelters 
  North Lyell Aerial Tram – from North Lyell Tram to Linda Railway Station 
 Mount Lyell Haulage
 Located on Philosophers Ridge down to Mt Lyell smelters
 Mount Lyell Quarry Railway
  
 Mount Lyell Underground Railway (also known as the North Lyell Tunnel) 
 
 Mount Read Haulage (also known as the Hercules Haulage)
 Williamsford to Mount Read – 
 North Mount Farrell Tramway
 Farrell Siding to Tullah – 
 North Mount Lyell Railway
 Gormanston and Linda to Pillinger/Kelly Basin – 
 North Lyell Tram
 North Lyell Mine to Mount Lyell Haulage 
 North East Dundas Tramway
 Zeehan to Williamsford – 
 Strahan–Zeehan Railway
 Regatta Point to Zeehan – 
 Tasmanian Metals Extraction Company
 Zeehan – Granville 
 West Coast Wilderness Railway – Formerly Mount Lyell Railway
 Queenstown to Regatta Point –  (Abt)
 Williamsford to Rosebery (Hercules ropeway) Aerial ropeway

Proposed but not constructed
 Great Western Railway (Tasmania) discussed and spent money upon approximately in the era 1890–1908
 Chudleigh Zeehan Railway – debated in parliament in the 1890s, never commenced.

West Coast Railways timeline 
 04.02.1892 Strahan to Zeehan line opened
 25.04.1892 Zeehan to Mount Dundas line opened
 18.03.1897 Mount Lyell line to Teepookana opened
 01.11.1899 Mount Lyell line to Regatta Point opened
 15.12.1900 North Mount Lyell line opened
 21.12.1900 Emu Bay line Guildford Junction to Zeehan opened
 23.01.1902 Magnet Tramway opened
 26.11.1902 North Mount Farrell tramway opened
 05.07.1932 Mount Dundas and North East Dundas lines closed
 08.10.1933 Comstock Tram closed
 02.06.1960 Strahan–Zeehan line closed
 22.12.1961 Tullah Tram closed
 10.08.1963 Mount Lyell line closed
 27.12.2002 First day of operation of rebuilt Mount Lyell line
 03.04.2003 Official opening of Mount Lyell line as West Coast Wilderness Railway

Dispersal of rolling stock 
Following closing of various lines, engines and carriages were often re-located on other working railways. Ex Mount Lyell passenger stock can be found on the Puffing Billy Railway in Victoria, while the West Coast Wilderness Railway has seen the return of reconditioned engines that used to work on the original Mount Lyell lines. A number of steam engines are held at the West Coast Pioneers Museum in Zeehan.

Following the closures of most railways in the early 1960s, rolling stock was dispersed but engines were fortuitously retained on the west coast, in most cases at the museum in Zeehan. Some of these have returned to service on the West Coast Wilderness Railway.

Notes

References

External links
 Listen to Michael Cannon's song '100 Miles (Emu Bay)' about the building of the Emu Bay Railway on the National Film and Sound Archive of Australia's YouTube Channel

Narrow gauge railways in Australia
Railway lines in Western Tasmania